The FIVB Volleyball Boys' U19 World Championship, called the FIVB Volleyball Boys' Youth World Championship between 2007 and 2011, is the world championship of volleyball for male players under the age of 19 organized by Fédération Internationale de Volleyball (FIVB).

The first edition was staged in 1989 in Dubai, United Arab Emirates and tournaments have been played every two years since then. The most recent tournament was hosted by Iran in the city of Tehran and won by Poland.

Brazil is the most successful nation in the tournament's history, with six titles and one runner-up. Russia is the second most successful with three titles and four runners-up.

A corresponding tournament for female players is the FIVB Volleyball Girls' U18 World Championship.

Results summary

Medals summary

Appearance

Legend
 – Champions
 – Runners-up
 – Third place
 – Fourth place
 – Did not enter / Did not qualify / Withdrew
 – Hosts
Q – Qualified for forthcoming tournament

MVP by edition

1989–91 – Not awarded
1993 – 
1995 – Not awarded
1997 – 
1999 – Not awarded
2001 – 
2003 – Not awarded
2005 – 

2007 – 
2009 – 
2011 – 
2013 – 
2015 – 
2017 – 
2019 – 
2021 –

See also

FIVB Volleyball Girls' U18 World Championship
FIVB Volleyball Men's U21 World Championship
FIVB Volleyball Men's U23 World Championship
FIVB Volleyball Men's World Championship

Notes

References

External links
FIVB Boys' Youth Volleyball World Championship Honours

 
International men's volleyball competitions
Youth volleyball
Volleyball
Biennial sporting events
V